Tobias Wolf (born 6 August 1988) is a German footballer who plays as a goalkeeper for SG Barockstadt Fulda-Lehnerz.

References

External links
 
 

Living people
1988 births
German footballers
Association football goalkeepers
Borussia Fulda players
KSV Hessen Kassel players
Kickers Offenbach players
3. Liga players
Regionalliga players
People from Fulda
Sportspeople from Kassel (region)
Footballers from Hesse